Maïga is a name or title that is extensively found among the Songhai nobility, denoting descent from Askia Muhammad I and Sonni Ali Ber. The name Maiga is a commonly used surname among the Songhai people in Mali, Niger, and other West African countries with a significant Songhai population. Additionally, the name is occasionally used as a given name. 

In Niger, the name Maïga is sometimes used interchangeably to refer to the general Songhai identity, rather than just as a title denoting nobility. In this context, it is used as an ethnic designation to refer to individuals who are of Songhai descent.

Etymology

The etymology of the name is said to mean "Mai" which means "ruler" and "Ga" which means "land" in the Songhai language. Some also suggest that Maiga means "help" or "give". In the present context, Maïga means "the one who is required to help" because they were the upper class who were required to lend a helping hand to the lower castes in ancient times.

Notable People
 Abdoulaye Idrissa Maïga (born 1958), prime minister of Mali in 2017
 Mohamadou Djibrilla Maïga, Nigerien politician
 Djingarey Maïga, Nigerien film director and actor 
 Abdoulaye Maïga, ambassador of Mali to the United States in 1960 and Czechoslovakia, Bulgaria and Rumania in 1964
 Abdoulaye Maïga (officer) (born 1981), appointed interim prime minister of Mali in August 2022
 Boureima Maïga, Burkinabè footballer 
 Abdoulaye Maïga (footballer) (born 1988), Malian professional footballer
 Aïssa Maïga (born 1975), Senegalese/French actress
 Aminata Maïga Ka (1940–2005), Senegalese writer
 Choguel Kokalla Maïga (born 1958), prime minister of Mali 2021–2022
 Aminatou Maïga Touré, Nigerien diplomat. She was Niger's Ambassador to the United States from 2006 to 2010
 Habib Maïga (born 1996), Ivorian footballer
 Mamadou Maiga (born 1995), Malian/Russian footballer
 Modibo Maïga (born 1987), Malian footballer
 Ousmane Issoufi Maïga (born 1946), prime minister of Mali 2004–2007
 Soumeylou Boubèye Maïga (1954–2022), prime minister of Mali 2017–2019
 Zhosselina Maiga (born 1996), Russian basketball player
 Abou Maïga, Beninese footballer
 Ali Sirfi Maïga, Nigerien Minister of Justice (2000-2001)

See also
Sohance
Songhai Empire
Songhai people
Songhai proper
Zarma people
Arma people

References

Surnames
Surnames of African origin